Princess Oraongka Ankayuba or Phra Chao Boromwongse Ther Phra Ong Chao Oraongka Ankayuba (RTGS: Ora-ong Anyupha) (27 October 1881 – 20 February 1882), was the Princess of Siam (later Thailand). She was a member of the Siamese Royal Family and daughter of Chulalongkorn, King Rama V of Siam.

Her mother was Chao Chom Manda Mohd Bunnag, daughter of Lord (Chao Phraya) Suravongs Vaiyavadhana (son of Somdet Chao Phraya Borom Maha Si Suriyawongse. She had an elder brother and a younger brother:
 Prince Abhakara Kiartiwongse, the Prince of Chumphon (19 December 1880 – 19 May 1923)
 Prince Suriyong Prayurabandh, the Prince of Chaiya (27 July 1884 – 2 May 1919)

Princess Oraongka Ankayuba died in her babyhood on 20 February 1882, at the age of only 4 months.

Ancestry

1881 births
1882 deaths
19th-century Thai royalty who died as children
19th-century Chakri dynasty
Thai female Phra Ong Chao
Children of Chulalongkorn
Daughters of kings